The Chartered Institute of Internal Auditors was founded in 1948 and attained its Royal Charter in 2010. It represents internal auditors in the United Kingdom and Ireland and is affiliated to the Global Institute of Internal Auditors, based in the USA. It is also a member of the European Confederation of Institutes of Internal Auditors (ECIIA). It is the only professional membership body in the UK dedicated to Internal Audit.

The Chartered IIA works closely with the Global Institute of Internal Auditors based in Orlando, Florida, and support the International Professional Practices Framework (IPPF) and are bound by a code of ethics.

The Chartered IIA currently have approximately 10,000 members and work very closely with some of the biggest private companies, Central Government, and local councils.

Career Pathway
The Chartered Institute of Internal Auditors is a highly respected and influential professional body in the UK and Ireland, the only to support that support the profession of internal audit. The Chartered IIA also support compliance, risk management and associated business areas. 

Much of the Chartered IIA's success is due to the Career Pathway of certification, and in 2020 launched the Internal Audit Practitioner programme and in 2022 a brand new syllabus for the Chartered. Both are proving to be extremely successful.  The bulk of the Chartered IIA's students are working towards the prestigious Certified Internal Audit, a designation in high demand across the world. Here the Chartered IIA offers two apprenticeships: Internal Audit Practitioner (Level 4) and Internal Audit Professional (Level 7).

The Chartered IIA distinguishes between two membership classes: 
Certified Professional members hold the CIA designation, and Chartered Professional members hold CMIIA. Members are required to undertake Continuing Professional Education to maintain their designation.
Non-qualified individuals can also join the Chartered IIA as affiliate members. 

The  Certified Internal Auditor (CIA)  is focused on the various aspects of internal audit, while Chartered Internal Audit focusses on the leadership skills required to head up an internal audit function.  
To successfully apply for the CIA, students must hold a degree. Non-graduates can study the CIA by first completing the Internal Audit Practitioner programme.
The CIA remains an extremely sought after designation, and is notoriously difficult.  

Chartered Membership is reserved for leaders of the profession. Individuals already in senior positions can obtain CMIIA via the Chartered by Experience assessment and aspiring leaders can complete Chartered by Learning.

See also

 List of professional associations in the United Kingdom

References

External links 
 , the institute's official website

1948 establishments in the United Kingdom
Auditing in the United Kingdom
Business and finance professional associations
Internal audit
Non-profit organisations based in London
Organisations based in the London Borough of Lambeth
Organizations established in 1948
Internal Auditors